Petneháza is a village in Szabolcs-Szatmár-Bereg county, in the Northern Great Plain region of eastern Hungary.

History

The jewish community
The census of 1770 mentions Jews who lived in Petneháza. Most of them worked as merchants. The Jewish community was organized at the beginning of the 19th century. During the Schism in Hungarian Jewry, following the Hungarian Jewish Congress in 1869, 1868 the community joined the Orthodox stream. There were synagogue, two cemeteries and mikveh.

In 1941 young Jews from Petneháza were taken to forced labor, and only one of them survived.

In March 1944, about a month after the German army entered Hungary, the Jews of Petneháza were taken to Nyíregyháza, and from there were sent a few weeks later to the Auschwitz extermination camp.

Geography

References

External links
 The jewish community in Petneháza On JewishGen website. 

Populated places in Szabolcs-Szatmár-Bereg County
Jewish communities in Hungary
Jewish communities destroyed in the Holocaust